B. darwini may refer to:

Ogcocephalus darwini, Red-lipped batfish
Oxycantha darwini

See also
 Darwini (disambiguation)